Carvin H Goldstone (born in 1984, in Durban) is an internationally recognised South African comedian, and the 2018 South African Comic of the year and 2018 Flying Solo Comedian of the year.

Performances
As a professional master of ceremonies and corporate entertainer, Goldstone has hosted and performed at events for companies, including Investec , MultiChoice , Nedbank , WBHO , KPMG ,] UKZN and Old Mutual .

He has performed at every major comedy Comedy Festival in South Africa and many around the world

Festivals

Cape Town Funny Festival 
Nandos International Comedy Fest
 Johannesburg International Comedy Festival
 Melbourne International Comedy Festival 
 Magners Asia International Comedy Festival 
 Stand Up Dubai 
 Mad About Comedy Indonesia 
 Perth Comedy Lounge
 Stand Up Doha

He was also the Graca Comedy Showdown, 2011, Winner.

Comedy Specials

2011 No Swearing
2012 iBruino
2015 Coloured President 
2016 Best of Carvin H Goldstone
2017 Culture Shock
2018 The Other South African Comedian
2019 Life Stories

References

External links

Reviews for No Swearing 
durbanisyours.co.za
iol.co.za
zero31.co.za
durbanlive.com

South African male comedians
Living people
1984 births
People from Durban